Baudisson Island is an island of Papua New Guinea, located south of New Hanover Island and west of the northern part of New Ireland. It is located between Selapiu Island and Manne Island. There is a plantation on the island.

References

Islands of Papua New Guinea